The men's javelin throw event at the 2003 All-Africa Games was held on October 15.

Results

References

Javelin